Climeworks AG is a Swiss company specializing in carbon dioxide air capture technology. The company filters  directly from the ambient air through an adsorption-desorption process.

History 

Christoph Gebald and Jan Wurzbacher founded Climeworks in November 2009 as a spin-off from ETH Zurich. The two German founders were fellow students in mechanical engineering and had worked with technologies for chemical and physical  in the context of their studies and subsequent doctorates. In 2011, Climeworks received capital from investors for the first time to develop a prototype with a modular structure. Since then, rapid scaling has led to their present module technology, which has been available since 2014. In the course of the enterprise's development, a partnership with the automaker Audi succeeded. Further support was provided by the Swiss Federal Office of Energy, which enabled the accelerated commercialization and scaling of the technology. Climeworks is part of several European research and development projects. Since 2018 a Swiss mineral water bottler in Vals has been producing beverages with carbon dioxide from the air.

The company's goal by 2025 is to filter one percent of annual global  emissions from the air. This requires the construction of 250,000 systems comparable to the one in Hinwil.

A German subsidiary, Climeworks Deutschland GmbH, has opened in Cologne.

On 20 July 2021 the Swiss and Icelandic governments agreed to jointly develop "negative emission technologies" which involve extracting  from the atmosphere and storing it underground using Climeworks and CarbFix (-to-stone).

In 2022, Climeworks with CHF 600 million received the biggest round of a later stage venture capital investment in Switzerland in that year. 

The corporate offices of Climeworks AG are in Zürich.

Projects
In May 2017 the company opened the world's first commercial project to filter  from the ambient air in Hinwil. It consists of 18 direct air capture modules that filter 900 tonnes of  each year, which are then sold to a greenhouse operator for use as fertilizer.

In October 2017, a demo project followed, in which a module on  filter is used at the Hellisheiði Power Station in Iceland. As part of the Horizon 2020 research project,  will be filtered from the air and then stored underground as a mineral.

In September 2021, Climeworks's Orca carbon capture plant came online. Like the pilot project, the operating facility is located at Hellisheiði Power Station.

The carbon dioxide captured from Orca is passed to a second company, Carbfix, who inject it underground in such a way that within two years it becomes stone.

Following Orca, a second, larger plant "Mammoth", will capture 36,000 tonnes a year, once completed in 2024.

Commercialization 
Climeworks has the only existing commercial direct air capture machine.  Although several other companies aim to commercialize direct air capture systems (e.g., Carbon Engineering, Global Thermostat), Climeworks is the furthest along in the market process, selling to a comparatively small market in high-cost  (i.e.,  used in greenhouses to enhance productivity may cost more than $1,000 per tonne if the greenhouse is located far from a source). This market is too small to support a robust ecosystem of small innovators necessary to explore the large number of chemical recipes and physical machinery that might decrease direct air capture prices. Thus, like photovoltaics or hydraulic fracturing and horizontal drilling, the development of direct air capture will likely require long-term government investment in incentives.

See also 
 Carbon capture and storage
 Hellisheiði Power Station
 EDL Anlagenbau Gesellschaft

References

Sources

External links 
 

2009 establishments in Switzerland
Companies based in Zürich
Corporate spin-offs
Direct air capture